Clock incident may refer to:

1994 NBA Playoffs - The Clock Incident, an event which occurred in Game 4 of the 1994 NBA Playoffs between teams Houston Rockets and Utah Jazz
2001 Michigan vs. Michigan State football game, called the "Clock incident" 
Ahmed Mohamed clock incident, an event that happened at a school in Texas in 2015

See also
The Counter-Clock Incident, an episode of Star Trek: The Animated Series, first aired in 1974
Activation on the incidence of a clock signal, see Clock gating